Novigrad ("New Town") may refer to several places in Croatia:

 Novigrad, Istria County, a town in Istria, a former bishopric and Latin Catholic titular see
 Novigrad, Zadar County, a municipality in Zadar County
 Novigrad na Dobri, a village in Netretić Municipality, Karlovac County
 Novigrad Podravski, a municipality in Koprivnica-Križevci County

Arts and entertainment
 Novigrad (The Free City), important location in The Witcher Universe

See also 
 Novi grad (disambiguation)
 Novgorod (disambiguation), the same kind of name in Russian
 Nowogród (disambiguation), the same kind of name in Polish
 Starigrad (disambiguation)
 Grad (toponymy)